Outsideinside is the second album by American power trio Blue Cheer.  Philips Records released the album in August 1968, only seven months after their debut LP, Vincebus Eruptum.

The album was recorded both outdoors and indoors—hence the title of the album. The songs include contributions from all members, along with two covers: "Satisfaction" by the Rolling Stones and "The Hunter" by Albert King. The album was re-released on CD in 1999 by Italian-based Akarma Records. It includes an additional song from the original sessions, titled "Fortunes", as a bonus track.

Outsideinside reached number 90 on the Billboard 200 album chart. "Just a Little Bit" was the first single from the album; it peaked at number 92 on the Billboard Hot 100 singles chart.

Background

Outsideinside was produced by Abe "Voco" Kesh and partially engineered by Eddie Kramer, who had worked with the Jimi Hendrix Experience and the Rolling Stones (and later engineered releases by Led Zeppelin, Kiss, and others). Some songs were recorded outdoors as well as in the studio.

The album's cover painting is by "Arab", and was designed by Gut Turk, a former Hells Angel. The album photographs were taken by famed rock photographer Jim Marshall. Outsideinside was the last record to feature the original Blue Cheer line-up; guitarist Leigh Stephens left the band after the album was released.

Critical reception

In a retrospective review for AllMusic, Mark Deming commented: 

In a review of the two-for-one reissue of the album (coupled with Vincebus Eruptum), Pitchfork's Alexander Lloyd Linhardt noted, "Outsideinside converts their [Blue Cheer's] stylistic enthusiasm and leathery attitude into structured song. If it doesn't sound as influential as Vincebus's cataclysmic insanity, it's because it defines 'classic' rock." Canadian journalist Martin Popoff praised the album where the band "pre-dispose of Purple, thwack the face of Hendrix, and generally pound psychedelia into the dirt" and concluded that "by most definitions this ain't heavy metal, but by most measures Blue Cheer stomp over Zep I and II".

Track listing
Details taken from the original Philips LP liner notes; other releases may show different information.

Recording locations
"Outside sessions"
Gate Five, Sausalito, California
Muir Beach, California
Pier 57, New York City
"Inside sessions"
A&R Studio, New York City
Olmstead Studios, New York City
Record Plant, New York City
Pacific Recorders, San Mateo, California

Personnel
Blue Cheer
Leigh Stephensguitar
Dickie Petersonbass guitar, vocals
Paul Whaleydrums

Guest musician
Ralph Burns Kelloggkeyboards, organ, reeds

Production
Abe "Voco" Keshproducer
Hank McGill, Jay Snyder, Tony May, Eddie Kramerengineers

References

1968 albums
Blue Cheer albums
Philips Records albums